Saundra Rice Murray Nettles Is an American feminist psychologist affiliated with the University of Illinois at Urbana–Champaign since 2012 to now. Saundra Nettles received her education from Howard university, earning her Bachelor's degree in 1967 and her PhD in 1976. Nettles has made huge contributions to the field of psychology, as she was a part of the psychology of women of the American Psychological Association, chair task forces in Black women's priorities and conducted studies on teenagers and children within the educational field. Nettles work has explored the intersections of race and gender with education. In addition to investigate the intersection between race and gender with education as for teens and children in the educational field, she has great concern with environmental factors within her studies, on how certain to little toxins of the environments may have affected performance. Overall Nettles has spent her entire career studying race, gender and education which has not only contributed to this new information in the psychology field, but also as a woman contributing this information and change in a time where women were mainly oppressed.

Influence on Psychology
Nettles has conducted a series of studies pursuing teenagers and children in an educational field, race and gender with education along with environmental factors. The contributions Nettles has made in her studies pursuing the aspect on race and gender have made changes in talking these concerns that are commonly faced today. As an example, Nettles contributions to creating a bibliography for black women and creating a directory of Black psychologists which has helped bring forward the issues and concerns that Black women not only faced but also were neglected. This work had been achieved by the committee known as Division 35, Psychology of Women, along with other feminist. This major contribution has provided networking opportunities for black women and further allows research to solve issues still faced.

As Saundra M. Nettles has continued to make valuable contributions, she has been more involved with women's studies as for racial studies. These studies have allowed her and others to understand and become more involved with others who face issues such as resilience in teenagers and children. She has participated in organizations that conduct research on multidisciplinary strategies that have the potential to help, develop and improve these issues. Saundra Nettles' accomplishments have not gone unheard, as it is seen the awards she has received in pursue of her studies and contributions to woman psychology. She has worked hard along with many other women psychologist who have not been heard.

Mentioned Studies
Over the years as Nettles has worked on studies investigating the relation between race, education and environment, others to have investigated these relations and thus cited her work. According to Rhodes et al., "Evaluations of volunteer mentoring programs provide evidence of positive influences on adolescent development outcomes including academic achievement (McPartland &Nettles)." It is seen here Rhodes et al. agrees with Nettles about her investigation on adolescents and their development, where Nettles has provided a suggestion to help this issue by the use of programs. In addition to this environmental influence, Noguera cites from Nettles that " In several communities throughout the United States, Black parents are turning to churches and community organizations as one possible source of support (McPartland &Nettles)." It can be seen that both Noguera and Nettles address the same issue and facts about racial communities seeking out help for support for their children. Nettles has allowed some insight into the main problem with the relations between these factors that impact individuals and further plans to investigate it along with other fellow psychologists.

Resources 

George M. (2012). Profile of Saundra Nettles. In A. Rutherford (Ed.), Psychology's Feminist Voices Multimedia Internet Archive. Retrieved from http://www.feministvoices.com/saundra-murray-nettles/

Grossman, B. J., Resch, L. N, & Rhodes, E. J., (2000) Child Development, Agents of Change: Pathways through Which Mentoring Relationships Influence Adolescents' Academic Adjustment. 71(6), (1662-1971). Retrieved from http://rhodeslab.org/files/agents.pdf

Noguera, A. P., (2003). Urban Education. The Trouble With Black Boys: The Role and Influence of Environmental and Cultural Factors on the Academic Performance of African American Males., (431-455). Retrieved from http://www.schoolreforminitiative.org/wp-content/uploads/2014/02/Noguera-2003.pdf

Year of birth missing (living people)
Living people
American social psychologists
University of Illinois Urbana-Champaign alumni